Stade Mustapha Tchaker in Blida is the current exclusive home stadium for the Algeria national football team. This has been the case since it was opened in 2002, Algeria have however also played many of their home games away from Tchaker throughout their history, both in friendly matches and for competitive tournaments.

History
Unlike many selections, "Les Fennecs" have no recognized national stadium. Whether for the qualifying matches for the World Cup or friendly matches, they turn around the country and changing in many however stages major international meetings are usually held at Stade 5 Juillet 1962 of Algiers. Other large stadiums were used to accommodate the  Les Fennecs  in recent years, including the Stade Mustapha Tchaker that also located at Blida. Other international matches were also played at the Stade 19 Mai 1956 of Annaba at Stade 20 Août 1955 and Stade Akid Lotfi of Tlemcen, and the Stade Mohamed Hamlaoui of Constantine.

The team of Algeria historically plays Stade 20 Août 1955 to Algiers which hosted the first international match of Algeria on its soil the 6 January 1963 deal with the selection of Bulgaria, match won with a score of two goals to one. Other historic sites that have hosted regular international home games of the Algeria are Stade 5 Juillet 1962 of Algiers but also Stade Mustapha Tchaker of Blida or also to the Stade Ahmed Zabana of Oran.

Algeria is sometimes relocates its friendly matches in Europe, Algeria has played many games at "home" in recent years France and Switzerland due to the fact that there is a large community expatriates in western Europe and much of the players play in European leagues.

Future for the Algerians Program

† For closed or demolished grounds, capacity is taken at closure.
‡ Currently in the process of, or scheduled to be developed.

List of Algeria national team Games by stadiums in Algeria 

 

† For closed or demolished grounds, capacity is taken at closure.
‡ Currently in the process of, or scheduled to be developed.

List of Algeria national team Games by stadiums 

† For closed or demolished grounds, capacity is taken at closure.
‡ Currently in the process of, or scheduled to be developed.

List of Algeria national team Games by stadiums in African Cup 

† For closed or demolished grounds, capacity is taken at closure.
‡ Currently in the process of, or scheduled to be developed.

List of Algeria national team Games by stadiums in World Cup 

† For closed or demolished grounds, capacity is taken at closure.
‡ Currently in the process of, or scheduled to be developed.

References

External links
 Official Site dzfoot.com

Home stadium
Algeria national football team home stadium